Renanthera imschootiana, also known as Red Vanda is a species of orchid occurring from the eastern Himalaya to China (southeastern Yunnan) and Vietnam. It is listed under Schedule VI of Wildlife Protection Act, 1972 making it one of the plant species which is restricted from cultivation and planting and a special license is required to grow them.

References

imschootiana
Symbols of Mizoram